Chimalpopoca (died in the year 10 House (1489)) was the third tlatoani (ruler) of the Tepanec city-state of Tlacopan. Chimalpopoca attended the festivities of the opening of the last phase of the Templo Mayor in 1487.

He proclaimed his son, Totquihuatzli II, as his successor before his death in 1489.

References

1489 deaths
Tlatoque
Year of birth unknown